Cassius Gaius Foster (June 22, 1837 – June 21, 1899) was a United States district judge of the United States District Court for the District of Kansas.

Education and career

Born in Webster, New York, Foster read law to enter the bar in 1859. He was in private practice in Rochester, New York in 1859, and in Atchison, Kansas from 1859 to 1863. He was a member of the Kansas Senate from 1863 to 1864, returning to private practice in Atchison from 1864 to 1867. He then served as Mayor of Atchison in 1867, returning to private practice in 1868, where he continued through 1874.

Federal judicial service

On March 9, 1874, Foster was nominated by President Ulysses S. Grant to a seat on the United States District Court for the District of Kansas vacated by Judge Mark W. Delahay. Foster was confirmed by the United States Senate on March 10, 1874, and received his commission the same day. Foster served in that capacity until his retirement on February 28, 1899.

Death

Foster died on June 21, 1899, in Topeka, Kansas.

References

Sources
 

1837 births
1899 deaths
Mayors of places in Kansas
Kansas state senators
Judges of the United States District Court for the District of Kansas
United States federal judges appointed by Ulysses S. Grant
19th-century American judges
People from Webster, New York
People from Atchison, Kansas
United States federal judges admitted to the practice of law by reading law
19th-century American politicians